Pogles' Wood (in its first series it was entitled The Pogles) is an animated British children's television show produced by Smallfilms between 1965 and 1967, first broadcast by the BBC between 1965 and 1968 (but repeated regularly until the early 1970s).

The original six episode series, The Pogles, was broadcast from 29 July 1965, within the children's magazine programme Clapperboard. The 26-episode sequel, Pogles Wood, was shown as part of the Watch with Mother strand, whose target audience was pre-school children (meaning, in the 1960s, children under 5 years of age): a somewhat younger audience than that for Clapperboard.

The 32 episodes were filmed using stop-frame animation, in Peter Firmin's barn (not in a BBC television studio). All were made in black-and-white. The episodes were narrated by Oliver Postgate, who introduced the story (typically beginning each episode with the show's catchphrase, Now where shall we find the Pogles?) and also voiced several of the characters.

The Pogles were tiny magical beings who lived in a hollow tree in a wood. The four principals were Mr. and Mrs. Pogle, their adopted son Pippin, and a squirrel-like creature named Tog, who was Pippin's playmate.

Original series – The Pogles
Comprising six episodes of nine minutes each, The Pogles set the scene for the sequel series entitled Pogles' Wood. Besides its focus on the titular family, the original series is especially distinguished from the later series by its appearances of the Witch, a mysterious and evil shape-changing character, and the tone of the episodes was regarded as sinister. After initially broadcasting it, the BBC considered it "too frightening" for its proposed inclusion in Watch with Mother, intended to be viewed by a very young audience, and advised Oliver Postgate to make all future episodes revolve around more everyday countryside matters. To reinforce these changes, the title of the show was changed.

Episodes
 "The Magic Bean" (29 July 1965)
 "A Silver Crown" (5 August 1965)
 "Pogle Go Home!" (12 August 1965)
 "A Flower For Wishes" (19 August 1965)
 "The Singing Bird" (26 August 1965)
 "King of The Fairies" (2 September 1965)

Sequel series – Pogles' Wood
The subsequent 26 episodes were broadcast under the revised title Pogles' Wood. This was shown as part of the Watch With Mother strand (billed by the BBC as for the very young). In this revised show the episodes were each 15 minutes long, to fit the standard length for editions of Watch With Mother.

The first 13 episodes of the revised show centred on farm and countryside life, viewed through the eyes of Pippin, Tog, and Mr. & Mrs. Pogle. The second set of 13 programmes had a stronger story element, wherein Pippin and Tog typically find an object and take it back to the storytelling plant, who brings it to life (in a precursor of the later Bagpuss show).

Repeats from Pogles Wood continued until September 1973, when the series was retired, as BBC children's television finally moved fully over to a colour service. The umbrella series, Watch With Mother, continued (though with a change of name), but thereafter broadcast only those of its regular shows which had been made in colour.

Episodes

Series 1 (April–June 1966)
 "Grains of Wheat" (7 April 1966)
 "Milk From The Dairy" (14 April 1966)
 "Honey Bees" (21 April 1966)
 "Sheep's Wool" (28 April 1966)
 "Eggs For Breakfast" (5 May 1966)
 "Trains" (12 May 1966)
 "Tog-In-The-Middle" (sometimes billed in Radio Times as "Pig-In-The-Middle") (19 May 1966)
 "The Secret House" (26 May 1966)
 "Noisy Engines" (2 June 1966)
 "Badgers and Bears" (9 June 1966)
 "Bears in the Wood" (16 June 1966)
 "Cake Crumbs" (23 June 1966)
 "Keep Clear of The Water" (30 June 1966)

Series 2 (October 1967 – January 1968)
 "Woodwinds" (3 October 1967)
 "Strong Music" (10 October 1967)
 "A Little House" (17 October 1967)
 "Bears In The Wood" (24 October 1967)
 "Bricks" (31 October 1967)
 "A Paper Tiger" (7 November 1967)
 "The Princess and The Jewel" (14 November 1967)
 "Flowers" (21 November 1967)
 "Kings and Queens" (28 November 1967)
 "Clocks" (5 December 1967)
 "Woodwork" (sometimes billed in Radio Times as "Tree Farming") (12 December 1967)
 "Roundabouts" (19 December 1967)
 "Umbrellas" (2 January 1968)

Comics
The Adventures of Pippin and Tog was a popular children's hardback based on the television show, published annually each Christmas in the 1970s. It featured comics originally prepublished in the children's magazine Pippin, drawn by Bill Mevin.

Home releases
All of the episodes of both The Pogles and Pogles' Wood survive, and all are available on DVD.

Episodes of Pogles Wood, selected by its creators, were initially released on DVD in 2006 by the Dragons' Friendly Society (an organisation founded by Oliver Postgate and Peter Firmin). Subsequently, three further DVDs followed, again released by the Dragons' Friendly Society, including the final collection of 14 episodes, released in November 2015 under the title Pogles' End.

Production staff
Writer
 Oliver Postgate

Puppets and Pictures
 Peter Firmin

Voices
 Olwen Griffiths – Mrs Pogle and Pippin
 Steve Woodman – Plant and Tog
 Oliver Postgate – Pogle, The Witch, King of the Fairies, Hedgepig, Fairies

Music
 Vernon Elliott, the British bassoonist

References

External links
 Official Pogles' Wood website
 British Film Institute Screen Online

1965 British television series debuts
1968 British television series endings
1960s British animated television series
1960s British children's television series
BBC children's television shows
British children's animated television shows
Television series by Smallfilms
British television series with live action and animation
British stop-motion animated television series
Television shows adapted into comics